The 2014–15 Penn Quakers men's basketball team represented the University of Pennsylvania during the 2014–15 NCAA Division I men's basketball season. The Quakers, led by sixth year head coach Jerome Allen, played their home games at The Palestra and were members of the Ivy League. They finished the season 9–19, 4–10 in Ivy League play to finish in a tie for seventh place.

Previous season 
The Quakers finished the season 8–20, 5–9 in Ivy League play to finish in a tie for sixth place.

Roster

Schedule

|-
!colspan=9 style="background:#95001A; color:#01256E;"| Regular season

References

Penn Quakers men's basketball seasons
Penn
Penn Quakers
Penn Quakers